Shred is a 2008 snowboarding comedy film starring Tom Green and Dave England, that was filmed at Big White Ski Resort and Silver Star Mountain Resort, two ski resorts in British Columbia, Canada.

The film is followed by a sequel entitled, Revenge of the Boarding School Dropouts (2009).

Plot
Shred is a motion picture that tells the story of two washed up pro snowboarders from the 1990s named Max (Dave England) and Eddy (Jason Bothe) who attempt to cash in on the fantastic growth of the sport by starting their own snowboard camp. Hoping to recapture their former glory, they begin by sharing their wacky wisdom with a group of up and coming young snowboarders. The story takes them from the run down ski hill where they grew up to a major event at one of the biggest resorts in the west.

The pair face off against Kingsley Brown (Tom Green), a deviously sleazy corporate snowboard rep and nemesis to Max and Eddy. With the assistance of his lackey Sphinx (Shane Meier), the underhanded Kingsley sets out to ruin the ambitions of Max and Eddy by any means necessary.

Cast
 Tom Green as Kingsley Brown, a corporate snowboard rep
 Carlo Marks as Chris James
 Dave England as Max Fisher, Kingsley's arch-rival
 Jason Bothe as Eddy the Yeti, Max's partner
 Amber Borycki as Tracy
 Alain Chanoine as Juice
 Pascale Hutton as Danielle  
 Lindsay Maxwell as Lisa
 Juan Riedinger as K-Dog, a wannabe snowboarder who tries to join Max and Eddy's team
 Kyle Labine as Mikey, K-Dog's best friend and fellow wannabe snowboarder
 Shane Meier as Sphinx, Kingsley's right-hand man
 Patrick Gilmore as Lennox

Notes

External links
 

2008 films
2008 comedy films
English-language Canadian films
Canadian skiing films
Canadian sports comedy films
2000s English-language films
2000s Canadian films